Donald Bradley may refer to:

 Donald Charlton Bradley (1924–2014), British inorganic chemist
 Don Bradley (1924–1997), English footballer
 Donald Bradley, President, Municipal Council of Newark, 1994–2006